Amanal Petros (born 17 May 1995) is a German long-distance runner and , the national record holder in the marathon with a time of 2:06:27h, set at the 2021 Valencia Marathon.

Career 

He won the bronze medal in the men's 5000 metres at the 2015 German Athletics Championships held in Nuremberg, Germany. In 2017, he won the silver medal in the men's 10,000 metres at the European Athletics U23 Championships held in Bydgoszcz, Poland. He also competed in the men's 5000 metres event where he finished in 4th place.

In July 2019, he competed in the men's event at the European 10,000m Cup held in London, United Kingdom. A few months later, he won the men's half marathon at the Cologne Marathon in Cologne, Germany. In the same year, he also won the silver medal in the men's 5000 metres and men's 10,000 metres at the 2019 Military World Games held in Wuhan, China. In 2020, he competed in the men's race at the World Athletics Half Marathon Championships held in Gdynia, Poland.

International competitions

References

External links 
 

Living people
1995 births
Place of birth missing (living people)
German male middle-distance runners
German male long-distance runners
German male marathon runners
German national athletics champions
Eritrean emigrants to Germany
German people of Eritrean descent
Athletes (track and field) at the 2020 Summer Olympics
Olympic athletes of Germany
20th-century German people
21st-century German people